The Duke of Luna is a Spanish ducal title first created in 1495 by King Alfonso II of Aragon and revived in 1895 by King Alfonso XIII.

List of holders

Succession
As with other Spanish noble titles, the dukedom of Luna descended according to cognatic primogeniture, meaning that females could inherit the title if they had no brothers (or if their brothers had no issue). That changed in 2006, since when the eldest child (regardless of gender) automatically succeeds to noble family titles.

See also 
 Alfonso de Aragón y de Escobar, Duke of Villahermosa
 Grandees of Spain

External links 
 Elenco de Grandezas y Títulos Nobiliarios Españoles. Instituto "Salazar y Castro", C.S.I.C.

Dukedoms of Spain
Lists of dukes